Iran–Tajikistan relations refer to the bilateral relations between Iran and Tajikistan. 
Since the collapse of the Soviet Union, the two countries have naturally enjoyed a close and strong relationship with the two often being described as  "one spirit in two bodies" by the ex-president of Iran Mahmoud Ahmadinejad due to both being Persian-speaking and Iranic countries.

Tajik independence
Iran was the first nation to establish an embassy in Dushanbe. It was also one of the first countries to extend diplomatic recognition of the newly independent Tajikistan in 1991. Iran provided diplomatic assistance and built new mosques within Tajikistan. Due to the resurgence of Persian culture and Persian language within Tajikistan, Iran helped encourage cultural exchange through conferences, media, and film festivals. Iranian television programs, magazines, and books became increasingly common in Tajikistan.

However, despite the many things the nations have in common, there are also vast differences. Tajikistan's post communist government is secular while Iran's is Islamic. Furthermore, Iran is a predominantly Shia nation while Tajikistan is Sunni. The leading figures of the Islamic revival movement in Tajikistan have stated that Iran would not be a model for whatever Islamic government they advocate for Tajikistan.

Tajik civil war

During the civil war in Tajikistan, Iran offered to mediate between the two factions; however, these efforts did not produce any negotiations. In 1995, Tajikistan opened its first embassy in Tehran, one of the few outside of the former USSR. Relations have since grown stronger, as the two nations cooperate in the energy sector and officials from both nations have supported stronger ties.

Post-tajik civil war

President Mahmoud Ahmadinejad of Iran (in office 2006–2013) has commented that "Iran and Tajikistan are one spirit in two bodies". He also added that there are no limits to the expansion of relations between the two countries and that "We do not feel that we have a non-Iranian guest with us thanks to the many commonalities our two countries share".

On February 12, 2011, Tajik Foreign Minister Hamrokhon Zarifi, at an event in Dushanbe celebrating the anniversary of Iran's Islamic Revolution, stated: "Today, Tajik society is witnessing the Islamic Republic of Iran's activity and role in the growth and expansion of Tajikistan's economy." Zarifi referenced projects like the Sangtodeh-2 power plant, Anzob Tunnel and Istiklol Tunnel and as examples of Iran's role in the Tajik economy.

Decline in relations

The relation between Iran and Tajikistan started to descend after the assets of wanted Iranian oligarch, Babak Zanjani, in Tajik Bank and his investments in Tajikistan industries were confiscated by Tajik government despite Iranian government's warning. Babak Zanjani was charged with money laundry, embezzlement 
and stealing over six billion dollars from Iranian oil and gas industry. His foreign assets was supposed to be collected as collateral and compensation but Tajik government refused to hand over the assets and denied Zanjani having any investment in Tajik Bank. Iran being under American sanctions and economic hard time saw this belligerent action by a friendly ally as a betrayal and a sign to reduce further commercial ties and industrial collaborations with Tajikistan.

The invitation of wanted Tajik opposition leader Muhiddin Kabiri by Iran to an Islamic seminary in Iran on December 27–29, 2015 which was warmly received by Iran's Supreme Leader Ali Khamenei 
exacerbated the relations even further. Tajikistan immediately issued a note of protest to Iran, Tajikistan's Foreign Ministry has summoned Iran's Ambassador to Dushanbe to express "regret" against this act and the head of the Council of Ulema of Tajikistan described Iran's invitation to Muhididn Kabiri as "abetting terrorism.”

The year 2016 was the lowest relationship point between the two countries since Tajikistan obtained independence in 1991.

Trade

As of 2011 Iran is the second largest investor in Tajikistan after China.

Energy and infrastructural projects
Anzob Tunnel

Sangtuda-2 Hydroelectric Power Plant

Istiklol tunnel

Shurabad Hydroelectric Power Plant

Rogun Dam

Highways

Revival of the Silk Road in the form of highways connecting China, Tajikistan, Afghanistan and Iran has been a major focus of the two governments.

Railroads

Planned system will connect Tajikistan, Afghanistan and Iran.

Future
Khatlon Cement Plant

In 2011 Iranian Ambassador to Tajikistan Ali Asqar She'rdoust released Tehran's plans to construct a $500 million cement production plant in Tajikistan's Khatlon province.

Common TV channel

Common television channel to be broadcast in Iran, Afghanistan, Tajikistan.

See also
 Foreign relations of Iran 
 Foreign relations of Tajikistan

References

 
Tajikistan
Bilateral relations of Tajikistan